Miguel Starling Lloyd Troncoso (born 23 October 1982) is a Dominican professional footballer who plays as a goalkeeper for Cibao FC and the Dominican Republic national team.

Club career

San Cristóbal FC
He scored a goal playing for San Cristóbal on 21 November 2004.

Racing Club
In 2005, Lloyd signed with Racing Club de Avellaneda, after a short spell in Talleres de Córdoba.

Árabe Unido
In 2011, Lloyd signed with C.D. Árabe Unido. He left the club in December 2018.

Honours
CD Árabe Unido
Liga Panameña de Fútbol Champion: Apertura 2012, 2015 Clausura, 2015 Apertura (3)
W Connection F.C.
CFU Club Championship Champion: 2009, 
Trinidad and Tobago Goal Shield: Champion: 2009,
Trinidad and Tobago League Cup Champion: 2008
Club Barcelona Atlético
Primera División de Republica Dominicana Champion: 2007

Individual
Liga Panameña de Fútbol 2015 Apertura Best Goalkeeper 
Liga Panameña de Fútbol 2015 Apertura MVP

References

1982 births
Living people
People from La Romana, Dominican Republic
Dominican Republic footballers
Dominican Republic international footballers
C.D. Árabe Unido players
Dominican Republic expatriate footballers
Dominican Republic expatriate sportspeople in Trinidad and Tobago
Expatriate footballers in Trinidad and Tobago
Expatriate footballers in Argentina
Expatriate footballers in Panama
Liga Panameña de Fútbol players
Association football goalkeepers
San Cristóbal FC players
Liga Dominicana de Fútbol players